Cratogaster is a genus of beetles in the family Carabidae, containing the following species:

 Cratogaster melas (Castelnau, 1867)
 Cratogaster occidentalis W.J.Macleay, 1888
 Cratogaster robusta (W.J.Macleay, 1883)
 Cratogaster sulcata Blanchard, 1843
 Cratogaster unicolor (Hope, 1842)

References

Pterostichinae